Arsenicals are chemical compounds that contain arsenic. In a military context, the term arsenical refer to toxic arsenic compounds that are used as chemical warfare agents. This include blister agents, blood agents and vomiting agents.

Examples

Blister agents
Ethyldichloroarsine
Lewisite
Methyldichloroarsine
Phenyldichloroarsine

Blood agents
Arsine

Vomiting agents
Adamsite
Diphenylchlorarsine
Diphenylcyanoarsine
Phenyldichloroarsine

References

Arsenic compounds
Chemical weapons
Poisons